The 1996 Speedway Grand Prix of Great Britain was the fifth race of the 1996 Speedway Grand Prix season. It took place on 31 August in the London Stadium in London, Great Britain It was the second Swedish SGP and was won by Australian rider Jason Crump, being the first win of his career.

Starting positions draw 
 injury  (14) Gary Havelock was replaced

Heat details

The intermediate classification

See also 
 Speedway Grand Prix
 List of Speedway Grand Prix riders

References

External links 
 FIM-live.com
 SpeedwayWorld.tv

Speedway Grand Prix of Great Britain
Gr
1996
Speedway Grand Prix of Great Britain
Speedway Grand Prix of Great Britain